Puntius punjabensis is a species of ray-finned fish in the genus Puntius. This species is endemic to Pakistan.

References 

Puntius
Freshwater fish of Pakistan
Endemic fauna of Pakistan
Taxa named by Francis Day
Fish described in 1871